Tapan Kumar Lahiri is an Indian cardiothoracic surgeon, medical academic and writer from the state of Uttar Pradesh, India. He is a former professor at the Department of Cardiothoracic Surgery of the Institute of Medical Sciences, Banaras Hindu University. The Government of India awarded him the fourth highest civilian honour of the Padma Shri, in 2016, for his contributions to medicine.

Biography 
Born in Kolkata, he has done FRCS in Cardiac surgery in 1969 in England and an M.Ch in thoracic surgery in 1972 from the same institution before starting his career as a member of faculty at the Institute of Medical Sciences of BHU where he held the posts of a reader, assistant professor, professor and head of the department of cardiothoracic surgery. After his retirement in 2003, he was appointed the professor emeritus (for which he doesn't accept salary, he is giving his services to humanity at free of cost after his retirement at same University hospital) of the institution. The Government of India honored him with Padma Shri in 2016.

See also 
 Institute of Medical Sciences, Banaras Hindu University

References

External links 
 

Living people
Recipients of the Padma Shri in medicine
Indian surgeons
Indian medical academics
Indian medical writers
Indian medical administrators
Scholars from Varanasi
All India Institute of Medical Sciences, New Delhi alumni
Academic staff of Banaras Hindu University
Medical College and Hospital, Kolkata
1941 births
Medical doctors from West Bengal
Medical doctors from Kolkata